Mine and Yours is the second album by singer-songwriter David Mead, released by RCA Records in 2001. "Mead is the consummate songwriter, much in the tradition of John Lennon and Paul McCartney or Paul Simon, creating timeless, memorable melodies that are fresh and inventive, while still ringing with a certain, inviting familiarity," wrote Brett Hartenbach in a review for AllMusic.

Track listing
All tracks written by David Mead.

"Flamin' Angel" – 4:22
"Mine and Yours" – 4:26
"Comfort" – 3:30
"Echoes of a Heart" – 4:26
"Standing Here in Front of Me" – 3:24
"No One Left to Blame" – 4:14
"Girl on the Roof" – 3:20
"Elodie" – 2:50
"What's on Your Mind" – 3:01
"What I Want to Do" – 4:16
"Venus Again" – 4:22
"Figure of Eight" – 4:36
"Only in the Movies" – 3:35
"Slow Night" (bonus track, Japan)
"Didn't I Warn You" (bonus track, Japan)

Personnel 
Dominique Durand – background vocals ("Mine and Yours" and "Elodie")
John Holbrook – Moog synthesizer ("Venus Again")
Jason Lehning – organ ("Elodie"), Wurlitzer organ and drum fills ("Venus Again")
David Mead – vocals, acoustic and electric guitars, keyboards, piano, bass ("Flamin' Angel")
Shawn Pelton – drums, percussion, programming
Jody Porter – electric guitar ("Venus Again")
Adam Schlesinger – keyboards, piano, percussion, programming, electric guitar, bass ("What I Want to Do")
Jon Skibic – electric guitars
Danny Weinkauf – bass

Production notes
Recorded by John Holbrook (Tom Dekorte and Aaron Franz, assistants) and mixed by Holbrook (tracks 1, 3, and 8-13) and Bob Clearmountain (tracks 2 and 4-7) (David Boucher, Richard Furch, and Darren Rapp, assistants). Photography by Stephanie Pfriender and David Mead and art direction by Frank Harkins.

References

David Mead (musician) albums
2001 albums
Albums produced by Adam Schlesinger